The 2023 San Antonio Brahmas season is the first season for the San Antonio Brahmas as a professional American football franchise. They are members of the XFL, one of eight teams to compete in the league for the 2023 season. The Brahmas will play their home games at the Alamodome and be led by head coach Hines Ward.

Front office changes
After week 1 the XFL fired VP of Business/Event Operation Mike Sheehan for "personnel matter".

Schedule
All times Central

Regular Season

Game summaries

Week 1: vs. St. Louis Battlehawks

Week 2: at Orlando Guardians

Week 3: at Houston Roughnecks

Week 4: at Seattle Sea Dragons

Week 5: vs. Arlington Renegades
{{Americanfootballbox
|titlestyle=;text-align:center;
|state=autocollapse
|title=Week 5: Arlington Renegades at San Antonio Brahmas – Game summary
|date=
|time=8:00 p.m. CDT
|road=Renegades
|R1=3|R2=3|R3=6|R4=0
|home=Brahmas
|H1=7|H2=3|H3=0|H4=0
|stadium=Alamodome, San Antonio, Texas
|attendance=13,274
|weather=
|referee=Jeff Heaser
|TV=ESPN2
|TVAnnouncers=Tom Hart, Cole Cubelic, and Katie George 
|reference=
|scoring=

First quarter
 ARL – Taylor Russolino 43-yard field goal, 9:48. Renegades 3–0 Drive: 9 Plays, 45 Yards, 5:12.
 SA – T. J. Vasher 6-yard pass from Reid Sinnett (1-pt Conversion Good by T. J. Vasher), 2:55. Brahmas 7–3. Drive: 7 Plays, 33 Yards, 3:37.Second quarter ARL – Taylor Russolino 25-yard field goal, 10:40. Brahmas 7–6. Drive: 15 Plays, 78 Yards, 7:15.
 SA – Parker Romo 45-yard field goal, 0:04. Brahmas 10–6. Drive: 5 Plays, 34 Yards, 1:00.

Third quarter 
 ARL – De'Veon Smith 1-yard rush (2-pt Conversion No Good), 1:12. Renegades 12–10. Drive: 14 Plays, 98 Yards, 8:35.Fourth quarter 

|stats=Top passers ARL – Kyle Sloter – 14/26, 148 yards, 0 TD 
 SA – Reid Sinnett – 13/19, 97 yards, 1 TDTop rushers ARL – De'Veon Smith – 19 rushes, 44 yards 
 SA – Jacques Patrick – 6 rushes, 26 yardsTop receivers' 
 ARL – Sal Cannella – 4 receptions, 32 yards
 SA – Kalen Ballage – 5 receptions, 42 yards

}}

Week 6: at Arlington Renegades

Standings

Staff*Jaime Elizondo no longer Offensive Coordinator after Week 4, Jimmie Johnson took over duties while Elizondo became the Wide Receiver's Coach''

Roster

References

San Antonio
San Antonio Brahmas
San Antonio Brahmas